Lee Soo-kyung (born October 24, 1996), is a South Korean actress. She is the youngest and twice winner of Baeksang Arts Awards, one of the most prestigious entertainment awards in South Korea, for Best Supporting Actress with 2017 and 2021 films Heart Blackened and Miracle: Letters to the President.

Career 
Lee Soo-kyung enrolled in an acting school as part of her parents' wish for Lee to learns various skills like playing musical instruments, etc. She was then chosen to lead 2012 short film In the Summer. Her mainstream debut was in 2015, with both crime film Coin Locker Girl as pink-haired rogue girl living in Incheon's Chinatown and tvN's romantic comedy television series Hogu's Love as the protagonist's twin sister.

In 2017 Lee received critical acclaim for two films: a romantic coming-of-age about a schoolgirl who falls for her coach Yongsoon in which Lee got nominated for several major film awards, and a crime legal Heart Blackened in which her role as a murder suspect daughter of a powerful businessman earned her the first win and youngest winner record of Baeksang Arts Awards for Best Supporting Actress.

Lee returned to small screen with 2018 SBS workplace drama Where Stars Land, as the youngest team member of Incheon International Airport's Security Service. 

Lee was cast in one series and one film in 2021. She acted as a cold and heavily-pressured law school student in JTBC's legal crime Law School, and as a tough firstborn daughter of the family main cast in the film that brings a second Baeksang Arts Awards for Lee 4 years after her first win, docudrama Miracle: Letters to the President.

In 2022 Lee acted in tvN's crime mystery Adamas as a TV reporter who hides a secret of being a murder witness in her childhood.

Filmography

Film

Television series

Awards and nominations

References

External links
 
 
 
 

1996 births
Living people
Actresses from Seoul
South Korean film actresses
South Korean television actresses
21st-century South Korean actresses
Best Supporting Actress Paeksang Arts Award (film) winners